The Erms Valley Railway (German: Ermstalbahn, originally written as Ermsthalbahn) is a single-track branch line in the German state of Baden-Württemberg. It links Metzingen, where it branches off from the Plochingen–Tübingen railway with Bad Urach (called Urach until July 1983) on the northern edge of the Swabian Jura (Schwäbische Alb). For its entire length, the branch line follows the Erms river and it is now operated by the Erms-Neckar-Bahn Eisenbahninfrastruktur AG (ENAG).

History

The Erms Valley Railway was opened on 27 December 1873 as a private railway by the Ermsthalbahn-Gesellschaft ("Erms Valley Railway Company"). The concession consigned the railway with effect from 1 April 1904 to the Kingdom of Württemberg, after which the railway was controlled by the  Royal Württemberg State Railways (Königlich Württembergischen Staats-Eisenbahnen). On 2 August 1919, the line was extended by 1.194 km to Kunstmühle Künkele. Although this extension was only for the carriage of freight to the mill, provision was made for the construction of an envisaged extension towards Münsingen, which would have created a link to the Reutlingen–Schelklingen railway. After the First World War, the line became part of Deutsche Reichsbahn, which was founded in 1920, and after the Second World War it was taken over by Deutsche Bundesbahn (DB).

The temporary closure of the railway began in the summer of 1971; the DB abandoned operations on the last section between the loading point of the URACA pump factory and Kunstmühle. On Friday, 27 May 1976, the last regular passenger service ran to Urach, but freight traffic was still maintained to URACA. Special excursion trains also operated on the line. In July 1983, Urach was declared to be a spa town and renamed Bad Urach, but freight traffic continued to fall. At the end of 1989, the sparse freight between the crossing loop at Dettingen Gsaidt and Bad Urach was finally abandoned.

Current situation 

The aspirations of the neighbouring communities, especially the spa town of Bad Urach, to revive rail transport led first to the establishment of the Ermstal-Verkehrsgesellschaft mbH (“Erms Valley Transport Company”, EVG). This took over the line on 28 December 1993 with effect from 1 January 1994 from the former Deutsche Bundesbahn for the symbolic price of one Deutschmark. In 1995, the EVG was reformed as the Erms-Neckar-Bahn AG (ENAG) in Bad Urach.

On 1 August 1999, regular passenger services to Bad Urach were resumed, with traffic operated by DB ZugBus Regionalverkehr Alb-Bodensee GmbH (RAB), a Deutsche Bahn subsidiary that operates buses and trains in the region. Since then, Regionalbahn trains, composed of Stadler Regio-Shuttle RS1 (class 650) diesel railcars, have run every hour from Herrenberg running via the Ammer Valley Railway and the Plochingen–Tübingen railway to Bad Urach, but some services run only between Bad Urach and Metzingen or Reutlingen. The regular services were preceded by the operation of tourist services on weekends in the summer of 1998.

Parallel to the Erms Valley Railway, the RAB also operates bus, the timetables of which are coordinated with the train timetable.

Fares

The Erms Valley Railway has been fully  integrated since 1 January 2002 in the Verkehrsverbund Neckar-Alb-Donau (Naldo) transport association and it passes through cells 219 (the Metzingen-Dettingen section) and 221 (the Dettingen-Bad Urach section) of the Naldo “honeycomb” fare structure.  All four stations in the municipality of Dettingen line on the edge of both cells. For journeys outside the limit of the Naldo fare zones, standard Deutsche Bahn fares apply. There are Deutsche Bahn ticket machines available at all stations and all stations except Metzingen are unstaffed.

Planning 

For several years, there have been considerations due to increased ridership of establishing a tram-train network called the Regionalstadtbahn Neckar-Alb, which would include the  Erms Valley Railway with services running every half-hour. This would involve electrification and a section by section doubling of the track.

In January 2016, the Tübingen region initiated the planning approval process for the so-called "Module 1" of the Regionalstadtbahn Neckar-Alb. This includes among other things the electrification of the Erms Valley Railway and the Ammer Valley Railway. All breakpoints are to be brought to a uniform length of 80 m and height of 55 cm. The extension of a headshunt in Bad Urach and the establishment of a crossing loop at Dettingen Gsaidt station to enable a half-hourly service are also provided.

References

Sources

External links 

 
 
 

Railway lines in Baden-Württemberg
Railway lines opened in 1873
1873 establishments in Germany
Buildings and structures in Reutlingen (district)